XEXPUJ-AM (La Voz del Corazón de la Selva – "The Voice of the Heart of the Rain Forest") is an indigenous community radio station broadcasting in Spanish, Yucatec Maya and Ch'ol from Xpujil, Calakmul Municipality, in the Mexican state of Campeche.

It is run by the Cultural Indigenist Broadcasting System (SRCI) of the National Institute of Indigenous Peoples (INPI).

External links

References

Radio stations in Campeche
Sistema de Radiodifusoras Culturales Indígenas
Yucatec Maya language
Radio stations established in 1995
Daytime-only radio stations in Mexico